Dragpa Gyaltsen may refer to:
Jetsun Dragpa Gyaltsen (1147–1216), third of the five Sakya Patriarchs
Duldzin Dragpa Gyaltsen (1350–1413), one of the main disciples of Je Tsongkhapa
Gongma Drakpa Gyaltsen (1374–1432), ruler of Tibet from 1385 to 1432
Tulku Dragpa Gyaltsen (1619–1656), contemporary of the 5th Dalai Lama